The 2018–19 season was Olympique de Marseille's 69th professional season since its creation in 1899 and 23rd consecutive season in the top flight. The club participated in Ligue 1, Coupe de France, Coupe de la Ligue and the UEFA Europa League.

Players

Squad

Out on loan

Reserve squad

Transfers

Summer

Friendlies

Competitions

Ligue 1

League table

Results summary

Results by round

Results

Coupe de France

Coupe de la Ligue

UEFA Europa League

Group stage

Statistics

Appearances and goals

|-
! colspan=14 style=background:#dcdcdc; text-align:center| Goalkeepers

|-
! colspan=14 style=background:#dcdcdc; text-align:center| Defenders

|-
! colspan=14 style=background:#dcdcdc; text-align:center| Midfielders

|-
! colspan=14 style=background:#dcdcdc; text-align:center| Forwards

|-
! colspan=14 style=background:#dcdcdc; text-align:center| Players transferred out during the season

Goalscorers

References

External links

Olympique de Marseille seasons
Marseille
Marseille